Oulun Palloseura or OPS is a Finnish multi-sports club based in Oulu. The club has sections in football, bandy and bowling. The club was founded in 1927.

Football

The football team has won the Finnish championship twice (1979, 1980) and as a consequence played in the European Cup twice. On both occasions they met the English champions Liverpool. In the 1980–81 season they drew 1–1 in Finland, and lost 1–10 at Anfield. In the 1981–82 season they lost 0–1 in Finland, and 0–7 at Anfield.

Now their senior football team is playing in Ykkönen.

Bandy
OPS bandy club is playing in the top tier of Finnish bandy, the Bandyliiga.

Achievements
Finnish Championship
Winners 1953, 1956, 1960, 1961, 1962, 1963, 1964
Silver 1945, 1946, 1947, 1948, 1951, 1952, 1955, 1957, 1958, 1959
Bronze  1954, 1965, 1967

Bandy clubs in Finland
Football clubs in Finland
Sport in Oulu
Bandy clubs established in 1927
Association football clubs established in 1927
1927 establishments in Finland
Multi-sport clubs in Finland